Two Bright Boys is a 1939 American drama film directed by Joseph Santley, written by Val Burton and Edmund Hartmann, and starring Jackie Cooper, Freddie Bartholomew, Alan Dinehart, Melville Cooper, Dorothy Peterson and J. M. Kerrigan. It was released on September 15, 1939, by Universal Pictures.

Plot

Cast          
Jackie Cooper as Rory O'Donnell
Freddie Bartholomew as David Harrington
Alan Dinehart as Bill Hallet
Melville Cooper as Hilary Harrington
Dorothy Peterson as Kathleen O'Donnell
J. M. Kerrigan as Mike Casey
Willard Robertson as Clayton
Eddie Acuff as Washburn
Hal K. Dawson as Boswell
Eddy Waller as Sheriff
Harry Worth as Maxwell

References

External links
 

1939 films
1930s English-language films
American drama films
1939 drama films
Universal Pictures films
Films directed by Joseph Santley
American black-and-white films
1930s American films